Alī ibn Mubārak ibn Rumaythah ibn ibn Muḥammad Abī Numayy al-Ḥasanī was a co-Emir of Mecca during the reign of his cousin Inan ibn Mughamis.

Notes

References

Emirs